The East Riding of Yorkshire is a local government district with the status of a unitary authority.  For ceremonial purposes it includes the neighbouring city and unitary authority of Kingston upon Hull.

Buildings in England are given listed building status by the Secretary of State for Culture, Media and Sport, acting on the recommendation of English Heritage.  Listed status gives the structure national recognition and protection against alteration or demolition without authorisation.  Grade I listed buildings are defined as being of "exceptional interest, sometimes considered to be internationally important"; only 2.5 per cent of listed buildings are included in this grade. This is a complete list of Grade I listed churches and chapels in the East Riding of Yorkshire (including Kingston upon Hull) as recorded in the National Heritage List for England.

Christian churches have existed in the area covered by this list since Anglo-Saxon times, although architectural features from that era are uncommon. Norman features are much more common and are found in many churches, including St Martin, Burton Agnes, St Mary, Fridaythorpe, All Hallows, Goodmanham, and St Nicholas, Newbald.  All but three of the churches in the list were built before the 17th century, and all of them contain features of English Gothic architecture, all periods of this style being represented.  Three churches were built in the 19th century.  The Chapel of the Virgin and St Everilda at Everingham (1836–39) is a Roman Catholic chapel in Italianate style.  The other two churches are in Gothic Revival style: St Leonard, Scorborough (1857–59), and St Mary, South Dalton (1858–61).  Gothic Revival architecture is also found in additions made to churches during the 19th and 20th centuries in, for example, St James, Nunburnholme, and All Saints, Skipsea.

The area contains little good material for building churches, much of it lying on chalk and clay.  There are some deposits of limestone and sandstone, but their quality does not allow for the production of a good ashlar finish.  Many churches in York are built from better quality limestone quarried from outside the area, from Tadcaster and Thorner.  An unusual building material for some of the churches in the area is "cobble", which consists of rounded boulders from the beach at Holderness.  Churches in the list containing cobbles include All Saints, Easington, All Saints, Preston, and St Peter and St Paul, Burton Pidsea.

Churches

References

Bibliography

 
Yorkshire
 
 
Churches